Francis Kenton (c. 1689 - 1755) was the member of the Parliament of Great Britain for Salisbury for the parliament of 1722 to 1727.

References 

Members of Parliament for Salisbury
British MPs 1722–1727
1680s births
1755 deaths
Year of birth uncertain